Justus Azzopardi (18th century) was a minor Maltese philosopher. His area of specialisation in philosophy was chiefly metaphysics. No portrait of him is known to exist as yet.

Life
Little is known of Azzopardi’s personal life. He was a diocesan priest, a professor of philosophy, and an adherent to Aristotelico-Thomistic Scholasticism.

Work
Just one work is known to have originated from the hand of Azzopardi: Neo-Veteris Philosophiæ Summa (A Compilation of Old and New Philosophy). It is work composed in 1762, when its author was still in his youth. No other works of Azzopardi are known to exist so far.

The Neo-Veteris was published in Malta at the printing press of the Grand Masters of the Knights Hospitaller. It is made up of 48 pages, and divided into eight main parts. Azzopardi states that he understood the study under the guidance of Saviour Lawrence Bonnici, who was presumably his philosophy teacher.

The eight main parts of the work successively deal with (1) philosophy in general, (2) logic, (3), physics, (4) Aristotle’s On the Heavens and the Earth, (5) Aristotle’s On Birth and Death, (6) Aristotle’s On the Soul, (7) ontology, and (8) pneumatology. The last two parts are metaphysical studies. The work concludes with an addendum concerning ethics.

References

Sources

See also
Philosophy in Malta

18th-century Maltese philosophers
Latin-language writers from Malta